Laha is a Kra language spoken by approximately 1,400 people out of a total population of 5,686 Laha. It is spoken in Lào Cai and Sơn La provinces, Vietnam. Laha dialects had been documented in 1986 by Russian linguists and in 1996 by American linguist Jerold A. Edmondson. Many Laha can also converse in the Khmu language, and Laha-speaking areas also have significant Black Thai (Tai Dam), Kháng, Ksongmul (Ksingmul, Xinh-mun), and Hmong populations.

Ostapirat (2000) considers the Laha dialects to form a subgroup of their own (Southern Kra) within the Kra branch.

Geographic distribution
Gregerson & Edmondson (1997) and Wardlaw (2000) report the following locations of two Laha dialects, namely the Wet Laha and Dry Laha dialects.

Wet Laha (Laha Ung) of Lào Cai and Lai Châu
Tà Mít Commune, Tân Uyên, Lai Châu, Vietnam (just north of the Black River) — known as the "Wet Laha". Edmondson's informant is from Bản Muot Village, Tà Mít Commune (Edmondson & Gregerson 1997). There are 8 Laha villages numbering no more than 1,000 people in Than Uyên District, Lai Châu, Vietnam.
Pha Mu and Nặm Cần Communes, Tân Uyên, Lai Châu

Dry Laha (Laha Phlao) of Sơn La — around the Sông Đà and Nậm Mu Rivers
Noong Lay and Nặm Ét Communes, Thuận Châu, Sơn La, Vietnam (just south of the Black River; in Bản Muot, etc.) — known as the "Dry Laha"
Chiền Xòm, Liềp Tè, Noong Giông, and Nặm Ét in Sơn La
Nặm Giôn, Chiền Xàng, Chiền Dong, Pi Toong, and Mường Bú of Mường La District, Sơn La Province. Laha of Nà Tạy, Pi Toong commune is documented in Hsiu (2017).
Thuận Châu, Mường La, Quỳnh Nhai districts of Sơn La Province
Bản Bung and Phù Yên near Sơn La Province on the north bank of the Black River

Phonology

Consonants 

 In both dialects,  can be heard as  when occurring before front vowels.

Final consonants 
Both have the same final consonants, except  is only in the Noong Lay dialect.

Vowels 

Both dialects have two vowels  in final position. They also may be heard as glide sounds .

See also
 Laha people

References

 Benedict, Paul K. 1992. "Laha Reexamined." In Linguistics of the Tibeto-Burman Area, 15, no. 2: 207–218.
 Diller, Anthony, Jerold A. Edmondson, and Yongxian Luo ed. The Tai–Kadai Languages. Routledge Language Family Series. Psychology Press, 2008.
 Gregerson, Kenneth and Jerold A. Edmondson. 1997. "Outlying Kam-Tai: Notes On Ta Mit Laha." In the Mon-Khmer Studies Journal, 27: 257–269.
 Ostapira, Weera. 1995. "Notes on Laha final -l". In Linguistics of the Tibeto-Burman Area, vol. 18, no. 1, pp. 173–181. 
 Wardlaw, Terrance Randall. A phonological comparison between two varieties of Laha: Syllable constituents and tone in Ta Mit and Noong Lay Laha. M.A. Thesis, The University of Texas at Arlington, 2000.

External links

 ABVD: Laha (Ta Mit) word list
https://web.archive.org/web/20131202230717/http://cema.gov.vn/modules.php?name=Content&op=details&mid=512

Kra languages
Languages of China
Languages of Vietnam